Paul Hubschmid (20 July 1917 – 31 December 2001) was a Swiss actor. He was most notable for his role as Henry Higgins in a production of My Fair Lady. In some of his Hollywood films he used the name Paul Christian. He appeared in dozens of films and television series between 1938 and 1991. Many of these were German and International productions.

Selected filmography

 Fusilier Wipf (1938, Swiss) - Reinhold Wipf
 Maria Ilona (1939, German) - Imre von Hontos, Maria Ilonas Bruder
 Der letzte Appell (1939, German)
 Mir lönd nüd lugg (1940, Swiss) - Hans Landolt
 Mein Traum (1940, Swiss) - Bob Ellis
 Die missbrauchten Liebesbriefe (1940, Swiss) - Wilhelm
 The Rainer Case (1942, German) - Franz Rainer
 Meine Freundin Josefine (1942, German) - Herr Milander
 Altes Herz wird wieder jung (1943, German) - Willibald Mack
 Wilder Urlaub (1943, Swiss) - Fritz Hablützel
 Love Letters (1944, German) - Robert Wieland
 Der gebieterische Ruf (1944, German) - Ferdinand Hofer
 Das seltsame Fräulein Sylvia (1945, German)
 Gottes Engel sind überall (1948, German) - Jo, ein amerikanischer Soldat
 Arlberg Express - (1948, Austrian) - Hans Leitner
 The Heavenly Waltz (1948, German) - Hans Lieven
 Mysterious Shadows (1949, Austrian) - Dr. Benn Wittich, Biologe u. Chemiker
 Bagdad (1949, US) - Hassan
  (1949, German) - Premierleutnant Hofstede
 The Thief of Venice (1950, US / Italian) - Alfiere Lorenzo Contarini
 Palace Hotel (1952, Swiss) - Fredy
 No Time for Flowers (1952, US) - Karl Marek
 Mask in Blue (1953, German) - Armando Cellini
 Die Venus vom Tivoli (1953, German) - Bölsterli
 The Beast from 20,000 Fathoms (1953, US) - Prof. Tom Nesbitt
 Musik bei Nacht (1953, German) - Robert Ellin
 Life Begins at Seventeen (1953, German) - Ramon Montadeau
 Hungarian Rhapsody (1954, French / German) - Franz Liszt
 Schule für Eheglück (1954) - Justus Schneemann
 Glückliche Reise (1954) - Robert Langen
 Ingrid - Die Geschichte eines Fotomodells - (1955, German) - Robert - Journalist
 The Ambassador's Wife - (1955, German) - John de la Croix
 Rommel's Treasure (1955, Italian) - von Brunner
  (1956, German) - Paul Heiden & Otto III
 Liebe, die den Kopf verliert (1956) - Conrad Hegner
 The Golden Bridge (1956) - Stefan
 My Husband's Getting Married Today (1956, German) - Georg Lindberg
 Salzburg Stories (1957, German) - Georg
 Glücksritter (1957) - Alexander Haupt
 The Zurich Engagement (1957, German) - Dr. Jean Berner
 Meine schöne Mama (1958) - George
 Voyage to Italy, Complete with Love (1958, German) - Robert Florian
 Scampolo (1958, German) - Roberto Costa
 Ihr 106. Geburtstag (1958) - Alfred Franconi
 La Morte viene dallo Spazio (1958, Italian / French) - John McLaren
 The Tiger of Eschnapur (1959, German) - Harald Berger
 The Indian Tomb (1959, German) - Harald Berger
 Every Day Isn't Sunday (1959) - Karl Brandtstetter
 Liebe, Luft und lauter Lügen (1959) - Herr Häggeli
 Marili (1959) - Robert Orban
 Auskunft im Cockpit (1959)
  (1960, German) - Major von Tellheim
 The Red Hand (1960) - Johnny Zamaris
 Die junge Sünderin (1960) - Alfred Schott
 Journey to the Lost City (1960) - Harald Berger
 Festival (1961) - Jack Lambert, Filmstar
 Napoleon II, the Eagle (1961, French) - Prokesch
 Isola Bella (1961) - Götz Renner
 Only a Woman (1962) - Martin Bohlen
 Eleven Years and One Day (1963, German) - Tony Cameron
  (1963, Austrian) - Diplomat
 Mission to Hell (1964, Italian / German) - Werner Homfeld
 Games of Desire (1964, German / French) - Elliot
  (1964, French / German) - Alain Compton - un gangster
 Marry Me, Cherie (1964, Austrian) - Dr. Andreas Gollhofer
 Mozambique (1964, British / German) - Commaro
 Me and the Forty Year Old Man - (1965, French) - Jean-Marc Oesterlin
 Le Majordome (1965, French) - Docteur Ventoux / Le 'chat'
  (1965, German) - Prof. Dr. Martin Wiegand
 The Gentlemen (1965, German) - Pflügeli
 Dis-moi qui tuer (1965, French) - Reiner Dietrich
 I Am Looking for a Man (1966, German) - Baron Federsen
 The Spy with Ten Faces (1966, Italian / German) -  Paul Finney, the Upperseven
  (1966, German) - Joachim Steigenwald
 Living It Up (1966, French) - Francesco Jimenez
 Funeral in Berlin (1966, British) - Johnny Vulkan
 Ein Gewissen verlangen (1966)
 Manon 70 (1968, French) - Simon
 In Enemy Country (1968, US) - Frederich
  (1968, German) - Parrish
 Taste of Excitement (1969, British) - Hans Beiber
  (1969, TV film, German) - Van Cleef
 Skullduggery (1970, US) - Vancruysen
  (1970, TV Mini-Series, German) - Ned Parker
 Versuchung im Sommerwind (1972) - Freund des Professors
 Bolero (1983) - Malinckroth
  (1988, Swiss) - Rolf Zeller
 Jolly Joker (1989-1991, TV Series, German) - Arthur Brecht
 Linda (1991, German) - Father

References 
Halliwell, Leslie (1981) Halliwell's Who's Who in the Movies. Harper-Collins 
Katz, Ephraim The Film Encyclopedia; 5th ed., revised by Fred Klein & Ronald Dean Nolen. New York: Collins

Further reading
Irène Hubschmid: Paul Hubschmid - Geliebter Mann, was nun? Erinnerungen. Militzke Verlag, Leipzig 2006,

External links
 
 Photographs of Paul Hubschmid

1917 births
2001 deaths
Swiss male film actors
Swiss male television actors
20th-century Swiss male actors